Elections to Liverpool City Council were held on 6 May 1982.  One third of the council was up for election and the Labour party retained overall control of the council.

After the election, the composition of the council was:

Election result

Ward results

Abercromby

Aigburth

Allerton

Anfield

Arundel

Breckfield

Broadgreen

Childwall

Church

Clubmoor

County

Croxteth

Dingle

Dovecot

Everton

Fazakerley

Gillmoss

Granby

Grassendale

Kensington

Melrose

Netherley

Old Swan

Picton

Pirrie

St. Mary's

Smithdown

Speke

Tuebrook

Valley

Vauxhall

Warbreck

Woolton

References

1982
1982 English local elections
1980s in Liverpool
May 1982 events in the United Kingdom
Election and referendum articles with incomplete results